{{Infobox television
| image              = Telenovela-victoria-500x605.jpg
| genre              = Telenovela
| creator            = 
| based_on           = 
| developer          =
| writer             = 
| screenplay         = 
| story              = 
| director           = 
| creative_director  = Piedad Arango
| starring           = 
| music              = Miguel de Narváez
| opentheme          = "Desde que te conocí" by Alejandro Fernández and Rocío Banquells
| country            = United States
| language           = Spanish
| num_episodes       = 171
| executive_producer = Hugo León Ferrer
| cinematography     = 
| editor             = 
| camera             = Multi-camera
| runtime            = 
| company            = 
| distributor        = Telemundo Internacional
| network            = Telemundo
| picture_format     = NTSC
| audio_format       = Stereophonic sound
| first_aired        = 
| last_aired         = 
| preceded_by        = El Zorro, la espada y la rosa
| followed_by        = Doña Bárbara
| related            =  
}}Victoria is the title of a Spanish-language telenovela about a woman who falls in love with a dashing younger man, when her marriage collapses around her.  It is produced by the United States-based television network Telemundo and RTI Colombia.  This limited-run series debuted in the U.S. on December 4, 2007, after La Esclava Isaura finished.  Filmed in Bogotá, it stars  Victoria Ruffo, Mauricio Ochmann, Arturo Peniche, and Andrea López.

Story
In her 25th wedding anniversary party, Victoria Mendoza (Victoria Ruffo) finds out her husband Enrique Mendoza (Arturo Peniche) has a mistress, Tatiana López (Andrea Lopez). Suddenly Victoria's whole life crashes around her as she realizes her marriage is wrecked. As she tries to heal the pain of her husband's adultery, she meets the 33-year-old Jerónimo (Mauricio Ochmann) out of the blue.

Victoria falls for this younger man, giving her a second chance at the true love and passion missing in her loveless marriage. Many of her loved ones oppose her relationship, including her daughters Paula (Geraldine Bazán) and Mariana (Laura Perico), her mother Mercedes (Margalida Castro) and her ex-husband. They blame her for the breakup. On the other hand, her son Santiago (Ricardo Abarca) offers unconditional support. Victoria has many problems but does she know she has those problems? Can she solve them? So Victoria faces a difficult decision: either fight to keep true love alive or surrender and let it slip away.

ProductionVictoria is a remake of Mirada de mujer (The Gaze of a Woman) [which is a remake of the lost 1993 Colombian telenovela Señora Isabel] and of its sequel, El Regreso.   This show's working titles were Tiempos de Victoria (Victoria's Times), Señora Isabel and The Mauricio Ochmann Project.

The show's premiere on Telemundo reached 782,000 core adult (ages 18–49) viewers, according to NTI, and over 1.5 million total viewers overall. The expanded the series' run to about 160 chapters from the standard length, 120 shows. There was no question of announcing any plans to remake Mirada's sequel, El Regreso (The Return) as Victoria covered El Regreso'' (both in one).  Géraldine Bazán won a Latin ACE Award for "Best Inspiring Young Actress" during her role as Paula.

Broadcast
Victoria airs on Caracol TV in Colombia, on Telemundo in the United States, on Fox televizija in Serbia, on Nova TV - September 26, 2008 and Diema Family - January 5, 2009 in Bulgaria, Televisa (on Galavisión) in Mexico, on POP TV in Slovenia, on NTV Hayat in Bosnia and Herzegovina, on Acasǎ in Bucharest, Romania, from August 2009 in Slovakia on TV Doma, on Shant TV in Armenia and from August 2009 on Farsi1 EutelSat Satellite TV Channel (Farsi1 later confirmed censoring some scenes including kisses and sexual actions in order to adapt the serial to Iranian culture).

Alternate ending
On August 4, 2008, Telemundo broadcast the alternate ending of Victoria through Yahoo! Telemundo. It was the first alternate ending of a Spanish Telenovela ever aired by Telemundo in the United States.  The first ending was romantic; the second was realism.  Victoria let Ochmann leave; then we saw her talking about how she's got everything (and doesn't need him): like her business, her grandchild, her amigas sinceras, etc.  There was an off-stage third ending wherein Ochmann made a pareja with Adriana Campos ("Yumelay from Zorro"—cute little Indian), who played his middle-story girlfriend (Penelope) in Spain whom he eventually left to go back to Victoria.

Advertisements
Product placements in the US version of this show include: JCPenney, T-Mobile Scrubbing Bubbles, Budweiser, Bud Light, Windex, Oust, Lysol, State Farm, Visa, Lowe's, The Home Depot, Walmart and Pledge. In some cases, Telemundo news programs can be seen or heard while characters are watching TV, even though this show is set in Bogota, Colombia.

Cast
(in order of appearance)
Victoria Ruffo .... Victoria Santiesteban Estrada De Mendoza/ De Acosta 
Mauricio Ochmann .... Jerónimo Acosta
Arturo Peniche .... Enrique Mendoza 
Andrea López .... Tatiana López De Mendoza 
Roberto Manrique .... Sebastian Villanueva
Diana Quijano .... Camila Matiz
Javier Delgiudice .... Gerardo Cárdenas 
María Helena Doehring .... Helena De Cárdenas
Camilo Trujillo .... Arturo Cárdenas 
Margalida Castro .... Mercedes "Memé" Estrada Vda. De Santiesteban 
José Julián Gaviria.... Martín Acosta
Géraldine Bazán .... Paula Mendoza Santiesteban De Villanueva 
Ricardo Abarca .... Santiago Mendoza Santiesteban 
Laura Perico .... Mariana Mendoza Santiesteban 
Patricia Grisales..... Carlota
Adriana Romero.... Valeria 
Andrés Felipe Martínez ..... Guillermo
Laura Londoño .... Eliza 
Ricardo González .... Henry Irazábal
Liliana Calderón.... Fernanda
Natalia Bedoya.... Estrella

References

External links
Official "Victoria" Website
 

2007 telenovelas
2007 American television series debuts
2008 American television series endings
2007 Colombian television series debuts
2008 Colombian television series endings
American television series based on telenovelas
Colombian telenovelas
RTI Producciones telenovelas
Spanish-language American telenovelas
Telemundo telenovelas
American television series based on Colombian television series